Troika is a 1991 video game published by Paragon Software.

Gameplay
Troika is a collection of three games, "Metal Hearts", "Ivan's Time Machine", and "Rebel Planets".

Reception
Matt Taylor reviewed the game for Computer Gaming World, and stated that "Although each of the offerings has a certain merit, this reviewer only had eyes for "Metal Hearts." All are structured in a reasonable, user-friendly way, with a save, password or stage select. Yet, one cannot help but think that, even with three games in one, Troika may be an interesting product, but it doesn't come close to Tetris."

Game Players PC Strategy Guide said that "Despite the inevitable first impression that Troika is a rehash of tired game themes, its forgiving nature sets it apart from the crowd. If you like arcade games but don't enjoy the usual attendant frustration, give Troika a try. It might addict you."

References

1991 video games
DOS games
DOS-only games
Fixed shooters
Minigame compilations
Puzzle video games
Video game clones
Video games developed in Russia